Glock Ges.m.b.H. (trademarked as GLOCK) is a weapons manufacturer headquartered in Deutsch-Wagram, Austria, named after its founder, Gaston Glock. While the company is best known for its line of polymer-framed pistols, it also produces field knives, entrenching tools, and apparel.

Glock handguns are used by armed forces and law enforcement organizations worldwide, including a majority of law enforcement agencies in the United States. In some countries Glock handguns are popular with citizens for personal protection and practical shooting. The company sponsors a competitive shooting team which travels worldwide. As of 2014, Glock produces more than two dozen models of handguns in three sizes and seven cartridges in three calibers.

Products

Handguns

Glock handguns are common sidearms among law enforcement agencies and military organizations around the world, and are also largely popular weapons amongst civilians for home defense, and concealed/open carry. The popularity of Glock pistols can be attributed to a number of factors. They are widely reputed as highly reliable, being able to function under extreme conditions and to fire a wide range of ammunition types (9mm, 10mm, .40 S&W, .45 ACP, .45 GAP, .357 SIG, .380 ACP, and .22 LR; third-party conversion kits for .400 Corbon, .40 Super, and .50 GI are also available). The simplicity of the Glock design as well as its simple operating method contributes to this reliability, as it contains a relatively small number of components (nearly half as many as the typical handgun, each of these being interchangeable requiring no hand-fitting) making maintenance and repair easier and less costly. On 10 December 2019, Glock introduced their first production-Model .22-caliber Pistol, The Glock 44.

The polymer frame makes them lighter than typical steel or aluminum-framed handguns, an attractive feature for police officers and regular citizens who carry firearms for extended periods of time. The trigger is the only operating element; all three safeties are deactivated when the trigger is pulled, and automatically activated when it is released. Glock pistols have no other manual safeties (as some other brands have an external safety often in the form of a lever or button); the only external controls aside from the trigger itself are the slide stop lever, the magazine catch, and the slide lock for disassembly. This adds to the simplicity of use and removes a potential source of error while operating the handgun under stress.  Most of the steel components in a Glock pistol are treated with a nitriding process called "Tenifer", which increases the surface hardness and makes the pistol resistant to corrosion and wear.

Though the Heckler & Koch VP70 was the first polymer-framed pistol and predates the Glock 17 by 12 years, the popularity of Glock pistols inspired other manufacturers to begin production of similar polymer-framed firearms, including the Walther P99, Smith & Wesson Sigma, HS2000 (Springfield Armory XD), Steyr M, Taurus PT 24/7, Caracal, FN Herstal FNP and Ruger SR9 pistols.

In addition to their semi-automatic handguns, Glock also produces a select-fire pistol, the Glock 18, which is able to be fired in either semi-automatic or fully automatic mode. This model is generally available only to law enforcement or military organizations and the details of its production are seemingly classified. Conversion kits for other Glocks to be fired in fully automatic mode also exist, but they are third-party, and they are specifically marked as Title 2 devices by the U.S. Bureau of Alcohol, Tobacco, Firearms, and Explosives – restricting their purchase and possession to ATF 3 license Dealers in the US.

Knives

Glock currently manufactures two models of knives, the Feldmesser 78 (Field Knife 78) and the Feldmesser 81 (Survival Knife 81).

The Field Knife 78 is a classic type knife, with a  blade and  overall length. The Survival Knife 81 has the same overall dimensions with an additional saw on the back of the blade. The Field Knife 78 weighs  and the Survival Knife 81 weighs .

The grips and sheaths are made of polymer and are available in three colors: olive drab, sand, and black. As of 2016 Glock introduced a new grey color variant of Field Knife 81 and has plans to discontinue Field Knife 78 in other colors than black.

Entrenching tool

Glock also produces an entrenching tool, the Feldspaten (field spade).

The spade and handle can be collapsed and shortened for easy transport and storage into a 260 mm × 150 mm × 60 mm (10 in × 6 in ×  in) package.

The entrenching tool is supplied with a nylon storage/transport pouch that can be attached to a belt or backpack.

Subsidiaries
Glock current international subsidiaries are:

 Glock America N.V. (Uruguay)
 Glock, Inc. (United States)
 Glock (H.K.) Ltd. (Hong Kong)
 Glock Middle East FZE (United Arab Emirates)
 Glock do Brasil S.A. (Brazil)

Embezzlement
Glock has been the target of multiple embezzlement schemes involving high-ranking officers of the company or others closely related to the company. In 1999, Charles Ewert attempted to murder Gaston Glock after Glock asked for a meeting regarding an accusation of embezzlement. Ewert was convicted of attempted murder along with an accomplice for his involvement.

In April 2012, Paul Jannuzzo, the former CEO of US subsidiary Glock, Inc., was convicted of racketeering regarding his involvement in an embezzlement scheme against the company.

Investigation of these cases brought to light questionable financial dealings in the background and complicated ownership structure hidden behind a string of shell companies in favourable tax locations around the world.

References

Further reading 
 Boatman, Robert H. Living With Glocks: The Complete Guide to the New Standard in Combat Handguns. Paladin Press, Boulder. 2002. .
 Kasler, Peter Alan. Glock : The New Wave in Combat Handguns. Paladin Press, Boulder. 1992. .
 Sweeney, Patrick. The Gun Digest Book of the Glock: A Comprehensive Review: Design, History, Use. Krause Publications, Iola, Wis. 2003. .
 Sweeney, Patrick. The Gun Digest Book of the Glock, 2nd Edition. Gun Digest Books, Iola, Wis.  2008.  .
 Taylor, Robin. The Glock in Competition, 2nd Edition. Taylor Press, Bellingham. 2005. .

External links

 Glock's official website

Manufacturing companies established in 1963
Firearm manufacturers of Austria
 
Knife manufacturing companies
Manufacturing companies of Austria
Economy of Lower Austria
1963 establishments in Austria